Schrevenborn is an Amt ("collective municipality") in the district of Plön, in Schleswig-Holstein, Germany. The seat of the Amt is in Heikendorf.

The Amt Schrevenborn consists of the following municipalities:
Heikendorf
Mönkeberg 
Schönkirchen

References

Ämter in Schleswig-Holstein